Avian may refer to:
Birds or Aves, winged animals
Avian (given name), a male forename

Aviation
Avro Avian, a series of light aircraft made by Avro in the 1920s and 1930s
Avian Limited, a hang glider manufacturer founded in 1989

Places
Avian, Iran
Aviano, northern Italy
Avian Island, Antarctica

See also
Avian influenza, a virus adapted to birds
Evian, a brand of mineral water
Évian-les-Bains, a commune in eastern France
Thonon Évian F.C., a football club based in Thonon, France